The surname Belson may refer to:

 Charles Belson (1773–1830), British Army officer of the Napoleonic Era
 Flavien Belson (born 1987), footballer
 Frederick Belson (1874-1952), English rugby union player
 Jerry Belson (1938-2006), director and producer
 Jordan Belson (born 1926), artist
 Kristine Belson, film producer
 Thomas Belson (? - 1589)
 [Belson Lim Seng Huat]

See also

 Belsonic
 Belson Stadium
 Bergen-Belsen concentration camp